Hassan Yazdani Charati ( born 26 December 1994 in Lapu Sahra, Chapakrud Rural District, Juybar County, Iran) is an Iranian wrestler. Yazdani is an Olympic and World Champion in freestyle wrestling in two weight categories. He became Olympic champion in the 74kg category at the 2016 Summer Olympics after defeating Russian wrestler Aniuar Geduev in the final. The following year he became World Champion at the 2017 World Wrestling Championships in the Men's freestyle 86 kg category. He won his second world title at the 2019 World Wrestling Championships in Kazakhstan and the third one at the 2021 World Wrestling Championships in Norway.

Career

Yazdani earned a gold medal at the 2014 Junior World Championships in the 66 kg division, by defeating his American opponent Aaron Pico in the final.
The following year, he placed second at the Senior World Championships, losing to Magomedrasul Gazimagomedov of Russia in the finals by a score of 10–3.

After bumping up to 74 kg. Yazdani claimed gold at the 2016 Rio Olympics, defeating Aniuar Geduev 6–6 with criteria by scoring the final points.

After once again bumping up in weight, Yazdani won gold at the 2017 Islamic Solidarity Games in the 86 kg division. He defeated former Olympic gold medalist Sharif Sharifov with a score of 11-0 and 2016 Olympic silver medalist Selim Yaşar with the same score en route to becoming champion.

In July 2017, Yazdani won the Iran Freestyle Wrestling Nationals at 86 kg, defeating Alireza Karimi 5-0 on his path to victory. This gained him a place at the 2017 World Wrestling Championships in Paris. In 2017 World Wrestling Championships in Paris, Hassan Yazdani participated in 86 kg. He became the champion with decisive wins, 4 out of 5 matches including the final with technical superiority. In the entire championship, Yazdani gave out only two points. Right after the matches, he stated that he "came to Paris for a decisive gold, with no ifs or buts".

He won the silver medal in the men's 86kg event at the 2022 World Wrestling Championships held in Belgrade, Serbia.

Achievements
 Olympic Games –  2016,  2020
 World Championships –  2017, 2019, 2021  2015, 2022  2018
 World Cup –  2015, 2016, 2017
 Asian Games –  2018
 Asian Championships –  2018, 2021
 Islamic Solidarity Games –  2017
 Takhti Cup –  2015
 Dan Kolov Tournament –  2019
 Paris Tournament –  2015,  2016
 Aleksandr Medved's Prizes,  2016
 World Junior Championship –  2014
 Asian Junior Championship –  2014
 World Cadet Championship –  2011
 Asian Cadet Championship –  2011

Senior career results

References

External links

International Wrestling Database

1994 births
Living people
Iranian male sport wrestlers
People from Juybar
World Wrestling Championships medalists
Wrestlers at the 2016 Summer Olympics
Medalists at the 2016 Summer Olympics
Olympic wrestlers of Iran
Olympic medalists in wrestling
Olympic gold medalists for Iran
Wrestlers at the 2018 Asian Games
Medalists at the 2018 Asian Games
Asian Games medalists in wrestling
Asian Games gold medalists for Iran
Asian Wrestling Championships medalists
Islamic Solidarity Games medalists in wrestling
Wrestlers at the 2020 Summer Olympics
Olympic silver medalists for Iran
Medalists at the 2020 Summer Olympics
Sportspeople from Mazandaran province
World Wrestling Champions
Islamic Solidarity Games competitors for Iran